Acharya Bhikshu (1726–1803) was the founder and first spiritual head of the Swetambar Terapanth sect of Jainism.

He was a Devotee of Mahavira. In the initial phase of his spiritual revolution, he moved out from the group of Sthanakvasi Acharya Raghunath. That time he had 13 saints, 13 followers and 13 the basic rules. This coincidence results in the name of "Terapanth" (Thirteen Path) and he referred it as "Hey Prabhu Yaha Terapanth".

The various beliefs and teachings of the religious orders of those times greatly influenced his thinking. He studied and analysed the various disciplines of the Jain religion and on this basis he compiled his own ideologies and principles of the Jain way of life. Based on the doctrines propagated, Acharya Bhikshu rigorously followed the principles. It was this way of life that was demonstrated by Acharya Bhikshu which became the foundation principle of Terapanth. The Letter of Conduct was written by him is still followed in the same manner with due respect with slight changes as per the time & situation. The original copy of letter written in Rajasthani language is still available. His followers piously referred to this monk as 'Swamiji' or 'Bhikshu Swami'.

Acharya Bhikshu visualised a systematic, well established and orderly religious sect and saw it taking shape through Terapanth. To organise and stabilise this religious order he propagated the ideology of one guru and brought to an end the concept of self discipleship. In this way his ideology of one Acharya, one principle, one thought and similar thinking became the ideal for other religious sects. Acharya Bhikshu said the common man should understand and practise true religion which would take him to the path of salvation.

Life
Acharya Bhikshu (aka Bhikhanji) was born in Kantaliya  in Rajasthan in 1726. He belonged to a merchant class named Bisa Oswal. He was initiated as a monk by a Sthanakvasi Acarya Ragunathji in 1751. Upon reading the scriptures, he found that the order of monks have wandered away from true teachings of Jainism; Ragunathji seconded the same but was unwilling to bring the same in the sect as they were hard to follow by the other monks.

Contribution 
In the middle of the 18th century, Acharya Bhikshu led a reformist movement. A philosopher, writer, poet and social reformer, he wrote 38,000 "shlokas", now compiled in two volumes as "Bhikshu Granth Ratnakar". His "Nav Padarth Sadbhav", which advocated a society free from exploitation, and is regarded as a significant philosophical composition that deals exhaustively with the nine gems of Jain philosophy.

Postage stamp

On 30 June 2004, the vice-president, Bhairon Singh Shekhawat had released a special commemorative postage stamp in memory of Jain saint Acharya Shri Bhikshu on the occasion of the "nirvana" bicentenary. The stamp issued by the Department of Posts is in Rs. 5 denomination. Two special functions were organised to release this Rs. 5/- stamp. The first function was organised at the residence of Vice-President of India, Shri Bhairo Singh Shekhavat at New Delhi. Second release function was organised at Siriyari (District. Pali, Rajasthan) where Acharya Bhikshu had attained Nirvana.

Main Events

See also
Jain Vishva Bharti Institute, Ladnun

References

External links 
Terapanth Official Website
Terapanth Website

Jain acharyas
1726 births
1803 deaths
Scholars from Rajasthan
Indian reformers
Indian Jain writers
Indian Jain monks
18th-century Indian Jains
18th-century Jain monks
18th-century Indian monks
18th-century Indian philosophers
Rajasthani-language writers